Xələfli is a village in the Jabrayil District of Azerbaijan.

References 

World Gazetteer: Azerbaijan – World-Gazetteer.com

Populated places in Jabrayil District